Stephen Southon (28 October 1806 – 10 March 1880) was an English cricketer who played first-class cricket for Kent sides in 1825 and 1826. All four of his first-class matches were against Sussex sides. Southon, who played as a wicket-keeper, had played for Kent against Hawkhurst in a non-first class match in 1823 alongside his brother, Charles.

Southon was born at Benenden in Kent, possibly the son of the village butcher, and emigrated to the United States in 1827. He died in Albany, New York, in 1880 aged 73.

References

External links

Date of birth unknown
Date of death unknown
English cricketers
English cricketers of 1787 to 1825
English cricketers of 1826 to 1863
Kent cricketers
People from Benenden
1806 births